Clarence Rufus Joseph Rivers (September 9, 1931 – November 21, 2004) was a Black Catholic priest and well-known composer of liturgical music. His work combined Catholic worship with Black Gospel, making him an integral part of the Black Catholic Movement. He also wrote several books on music and spirituality.

Biography

Early life and education 
Rivers was born in Selma, Alabama, but his family moved to Cincinnati, Ohio when he was young. It was there that he began his study for the priesthood. He did graduate work at Xavier and Yale Universities, as well as the Catholic University of America and L’Institut Catholique de Paris.

Priesthood 
Rivers was ordained to the priesthood in 1956 by Archbishop Karl J. Alter. He was first African-American ordained in the Archdiocese of Cincinnati,

Early after his ordination, he worked at St. Joseph Church, a historically-Black parish in Cincinnati’s West End neighborhood. He also was an English teacher at Purcell High School in the East Walnut Hills neighborhood of Cincinnati.

He began to gain notoriety for his music during the Civil Rights Movement, beginning with his "An American Mass Program," which combined Gregorian Chant with the melodic patterns and rhythms of Negro Spirituals. (He was influenced in this tradition by Sr Sister Mary Elaine Gentemann, who had composed such a Mass in 1945.)

Rivers' most beloved hymn was "God is Love," which he first performed at the first official Mass in English in the United States after the Second Vatican Council (which had opened the door in canon law for vernacular Mass rather than Latin). The song was used as the Communion Hymn during the Mass, which was held during the 1964 National Liturgical Conference in St Louis. It received a 10-minute standing ovation.

In 1965, Rivers formed a corporation named “Stimuli Incorporated” so that he could “share his gift of Blackness” with other Catholics.

He became director of the National Office for Black Catholics' Office of Culture and Worship during the Black Catholic Movement, and there organized various conferences and workshops in addition to spearheading the NOBC's cultural journal, "Freeing the Spirit" (a motif Rivers would re-use in various other contexts, including as the title of a short memoir). During this time, he added to his team one Robert Ray, penman of the "Gospel Mass" choral setting sung by choirs worldwide ever since.

He received his doctorate in African-American Culture and Catholic Liturgy from the Union Institute in 1978, and received the Berakah Award in 2002.

Death 
He died unexpectedly in 2004 at the age of 73.

Legacy 
Rivers was passionate about the drama of public worship, as well as the music that was the "soul" of worship. He was equally devoted to African American culture and was known for his lavish vestments and distinctive jewelry.

In addition to being a gifted composer, he had an acclaimed vocal style. But it was his personal faith and belief in the liturgy as a place where one encountered God that motivated all of his work.

References 

2004 deaths
Musicians from Selma, Alabama
American male composers
Catholic University of America alumni
African-American Catholics
African-American Roman Catholic priests
Yale University alumni
1931 births
20th-century American composers
20th-century American male musicians
20th-century American Roman Catholic priests
20th-century African-American musicians
21st-century African-American people